Louis Ferenc Puskas Fenton (born 3 April 1993) is a New Zealand professional footballer who plays for National Premier Leagues Queensland club Lions FC.

Early life
Fenton, whose mother is Hungarian and whose father is a postman, is named after Hungarian international Ferenc Puskás.

Club career
Fenton grew up in Tawa, playing for Tawa College and Tawa AFC before heading abroad for a brief stint in the Victorian Premier League with clubs St Albans Saints and Melbourne Knights. He lived during this time in Kings Park, in Melbourne's western suburbs, where he supported the Western Bulldogs Football Club. He scored on his senior professional debut in an A-League match against Sydney FC on 6 October 2012 with a spectacular diving header, courtesy of a Manny Muscat cross. Fenton made 10 starts for the Phoenix in 2013–14 before being sidelined for the year due to a dislocated shoulder suffered in a 3–1 away win to the Western Sydney Wanderers.

In September 2017, Fenton moved to Team Wellington.

In January 2018, Fenton signed again with Melbourne Knights

In July 2018, Fenton rejoined the Wellington Phoenix for the 2018–19 season.

In May 2022, Fenton announced his retirement.

International career

Fenton represented New Zealand under 20s at the 2013 OFC U-20 Championship in Fiji. He was voted the player of the tournament as he helped the team qualify for the 2013 FIFA U-20 World Cup in Turkey.

Fenton made his debut for the senior team on 20 November 2013, in the second leg of the 2014 FIFA World Cup qualifying playoff against Mexico, substituting Bill Tuiloma in the 50th minute of the game.

Career statistics

Club

International

Honours

Country
New Zealand
 OFC Nations Cup: 2016
 OFC U-20 Championship: 2013

References

External links

1993 births
Living people
New Zealand association footballers
New Zealand international footballers
New Zealand under-20 international footballers
Association football forwards
Wellington Phoenix FC players
A-League Men players
Victorian Premier League players
Melbourne Knights FC players
New Zealand people of Hungarian descent
People educated at Tawa College
2016 OFC Nations Cup players